"Dry Your Eyes" is a single by English rapper and producer Mike Skinner under the music project the Streets. The song describes the protagonist trying to cope with his girlfriend breaking up with him. It was released in the UK on 19 July 2004. The song is the Streets' most successful single, reaching number one in the United Kingdom on 25 July 2004, six days after its release. "Dry Your Eyes" also went straight to number one in Ireland staying there for three weeks in a row.

In Australia, the song was ranked number 19 on Triple J's Hottest 100 of 2004. In October 2011, NME placed it at number 87 on its list "150 Best Tracks of the Past 15 Years".

Music structure
"Dry Your Eyes" is composed in the key of A major. It is written in common time and moves at a slow tempo of 80 beats per minute. The song is carried by a first inversion triad. The radio edit of the song, lasting 3:22, omits the bridge and third verse. The official video uses this edit. However, some radio edits move the interlude after the second chorus to the beginning of the song.

The melody was taken straight from a royalty-free samples CD released in 1999. A plagiarism claim by unknown artist Epic was reported in the press in 2004, but no case was ever made.

Critical reception
Leonie Cooper of NME called "those violins, bringing all of the emotions" the best part of the song. Tony Naylor of NME called the song, "a hairs-on-the-back-of-your-neck ballad for jilted lovers" and stated, "rarely has Skinner sounded so vulnerable, poignant and, well, normal."

Track listings
UK CD1
 "Dry Your Eyes"
 "It's Too Late" (live radio session)

UK CD2 and Australian CD single
 "Dry Your Eyes"
 "Let's Push Things Forward" (live radio session)
 "Has It Come To This?" (live radio session)
 "Dry Your Eyes" (enhanced video)

Charts

Weekly charts

Year-end charts

Certifications

Release history

Cover versions
 A version of "Dry Your Eyes" featuring Chris Martin of Coldplay singing the chorus surfaced on the internet and received airplay on Los Angeles radio station Indie 103.1. This version was recorded for a BBC Radio 1 competition (listeners were told to call in when they heard this version of the song) and was never officially released, because Chris Martin did not agree with his vocal performance. This version frequently found American airplay on WFNX after its release.
 Brian Kennedy on Even Better than the Real Thing Vol. 2
 A parody version was performed by comedian Adam Buxton on the TV Show 2004: The Stupid Version, with the lyrics being about a man getting kicked out by his girlfriend because he repeatedly urinates on the toilet seat and wets the bed.
 "Dry Your Eyes" was performed in a scene from the 2021 comedy film People Just Do Nothing: Big in Japan, in which characters DJ Beats and DJ Steves cover the song in a karaoke bar.

References

2004 songs
2004 singles
2000s ballads
Irish Singles Chart number-one singles
Number-one singles in Scotland
The Streets songs
UK Singles Chart number-one singles
Locked On Records singles
679 Artists singles